Susan Elizabeth Walker (born 14 September 1951) is a British-born Australian politician. She represented the electorate of Nedlands in the Legislative Assembly of Western Australia between June 2001 and September 2008. Walker was originally elected as a Liberal member but turned independent in 2008.

Early life
Walker was born in Plymouth, England and arrived in Western Australia in 1967. She was a Bachelor of Jurisprudence and Bachelor of Laws graduate at the University of Western Australia.

Politics
A member of the Liberal Party since 1978, Walker entered parliament at the 2001 Nedlands by-election, replacing a former premier, Richard Court. She served as a shadow attorney-general under Paul Omodei, but resigned from the party in February 2008 following Troy Buswell's successful challenge for the party's leadership. Her stated reasons for leaving the party were the continued influence of both Brian Burke and Noel Crichton-Browne on State politics, as well as her party's support of a government decision to close a facility within her electorate. Walker remained in parliament as an independent until her defeat at the September 2008 State election by her replacement as Liberal candidate, Bill Marmion.

References

External links
 

Members of the Western Australian Legislative Assembly
Living people
Independent members of the Parliament of Western Australia
Liberal Party of Australia members of the Parliament of Western Australia
1951 births
21st-century Australian politicians
21st-century Australian women politicians
Women members of the Western Australian Legislative Assembly